Demetrius Hondros (April 9./21. 1882 in Serres  – July, 29. 1962, Athens) was a  Greek physicist. He was born in April 1882 in what was then the Ottoman Empire.

Hondros studied under Arnold Sommerfeld at the University of Munich, and was granted his Ph.D. in 1909. In 1922, he was cited as being professor of physics at the University of Athens.

Notes

http://www.physics.ntua.gr/~dris/DIDAKTO_D-H.pdf

20th-century Greek physicists
Ludwig Maximilian University of Munich alumni
Expatriates from the Ottoman Empire in Germany
1882 births
1962 deaths
People from Serres
Academic staff of the National and Kapodistrian University of Athens